José Trinidad Sepúlveda Ruiz-Velasco (March 30, 1921 – September 4, 2017) was a Mexican Prelate of the Roman Catholic Church.

Sepúlveda Ruiz-Velasco was born in Atotonilco El Alto, Mexico and was ordained a priest on March 27, 1948. Velasco was appointed archbishop of Archdiocese of Tuxtla Gutiérrez on May 20, 1965, and ordained bishop on July 25, 1965. Velasco was appointed bishop of The Diocese of San Juan de los Lagos on February 12, 1988, where he would remain until his retirement on January 20, 1999. Velasco died on 4 September 2017 due to respiratory complications at the age of 96.

References

External links
Catholic-Hierarchy

1921 births
2017 deaths
20th-century Roman Catholic bishops in Mexico
Participants in the Second Vatican Council
People from Jalisco